Alfred Remen Mele is an American philosopher and the William H. and Lucyle T. Werkmeister Professor of Philosophy at Florida State University. He is also the past Director of the Philosophy and Science of Self-Control Project (2014-2017) and the Big Questions in Free Will Project (2010-2013). Mele is the author of thirteen books and over 250 articles.

Mele attended Wayne State University and received his doctorate in philosophy from the University of Michigan in 1979. He taught at Davidson College from 1979 until 2000, when he took up his present position at Florida State University.

Free will and other topics
Mele began his career writing about Aristotle and practical reason, but gradually moved into a focus on contemporary issues in the philosophy of mind and action. While not taking a stand on the question whether free will is or is not compatible with determinism, Mele develops positive conceptions of how free will may be implemented from both “compatibilist” and “incompatibilist” perspectives. He also has argued that claims that scientists have proved that free will is an illusion are not credible. Mele is also known for his development of a causal theory of how intentional actions are produced and for his deflationary view of self-deception.

Bibliography (partial)

Books (as author)
Free Will: An Opinionated Guide. Oxford University Press, 2022.
Manipulated Agents: A Window to Moral Responsibility. Oxford University Press, 2019.
Aspects of Agency: Decisions, Abilities, Explanations, and Free Will. Oxford University Press, 2017.
Free: Why Science Hasn't Disproved Free Will. Oxford University Press, 2014.
A Dialogue on Free Will and Science. Oxford University Press, 2014.
Backsliding: Understanding Weakness of Will. Oxford University Press, 2012.
Effective Intentions. Oxford University Press, 2009.
Free Will and Luck. Oxford University Press, 2006.
Motivation and Agency. Oxford University Press, 2003.
Self-Deception Unmasked. Princeton University Press, 2001.
Autonomous Agents: From Self-Control to Autonomy. Oxford University Press, 1995.
Springs of Action: Understanding Intentional Behavior. Oxford University Press, 1992.
Irrationality: An Essay on Akrasia, Self-Deception, and Self-Control. Oxford University Press, 1987.

Books (as editor)
 Surrounding Self-Control — (Oxford University Press, 2020)
 Surrounding Free Will — (Oxford University Press, 2015)
 Free Will and Consciousness: How Might They Work? — (Oxford University Press, 2010; R. Baumeister, A. Mele, and K. Vohs, eds.)
 Rationality and the Good — (Oxford University Press, 2007; M. Timmons, J. Greco, and A. Mele, eds.)
 The Oxford Handbook of Rationality — (Oxford University Press, 2004; A. Mele and P. Rawling, eds.)
 The Philosophy of Action — (Oxford University Press, Oxford Readings in Philosophy, 1997; A. Mele, ed.)
 Mental Causation — (Oxford: Clarendon Press, 1993; J. Heil and A. Mele, eds.)

See also
 American philosophy
 List of American philosophers

Notes

References
Notre Dame Philosophic Reviews, "Free Will and Luck": http://ndpr.nd.edu/review.cfm?id=7984
Florida State University, Alfred Mele's Publications: https://philosophy.fsu.edu/al-mele-full-publication-list
Florida State University, Profiles: http://campus.fsu.edu/profiles/mele/
Davidson College, "NEH Grant Aids Davidson Philosopher's Study of Self-Deception": https://web.archive.org/web/20060916230719/http://www2.davidson.edu/news/news_archives/archives9798/97.06Mele2.html
JeeLoo Liu, Phil 3997 Syllabus, Fall 2003: https://web.archive.org/web/20060903031430/http://faculty.fullerton.edu/jeelooliu/397(Reasoning)%20Syllabus%20F03.pdf
The University of Sydney, The Annual Conference of the Australasian Association of Philosophy: https://web.archive.org/web/20060906001130/http://www.usyd.edu.au/research/events/2005/jul/03_app.shtml
 Alfred Mele on Information Philosopher

External links
Mele's Profile Page - at Florida State.
Mele's Publication List - at Florida State.
An in-depth autobiographical interview with Al Mele

1951 births
Living people
Philosophers from Florida
Wayne State University alumni
University of Michigan alumni
Davidson College faculty
Florida State University faculty
Writers from Detroit
Philosophers from North Carolina
Philosophers from Michigan